English singer Leona Lewis has released five studio albums, twenty-five singles, one live video album, one extended play and twenty-five music videos. After winning the third series of British television talent show, The X Factor in 2006, Lewis released "A Moment Like This" in the United Kingdom and Ireland, which became the fastest selling single ever by a female artist in the UK. Her follow-up single, "Bleeding Love" reached number one in 35 countries, and was the biggest-selling single of 2008 worldwide. The song has had over two billion streams. Lewis's first studio album, Spirit was released to follow the single; it became the fastest-selling debut album of all time in the UK and Ireland, and the first debut album by a British solo artist to debut at number one on the Billboard 200. As of April 2012, Spirit is the 20th biggest-selling album of all time in the UK. The next single, "Better in Time", was also successful worldwide, reaching the top ten in many countries. Subsequent singles "Forgive Me" and "Run" were released across Europe and Australia; "Forgive Me" went on to moderate success, while "Run" became Lewis's third number one in the UK, and also reached the top spot in Austria and Ireland. "I Will Be" was released as the final single in North America.

Her second studio album, Echo was released in November 2009, spawning two singles. Lead single "Happy" reached the top five in various countries in Europe, and "I Got You" was a released as the second single. She recorded the theme song, "I See You", for the 2009 film Avatar, then in 2010 featured on the soundtracks of Sex and the City 2 and For Colored Girls. In November 2010 Lewis released a video album of her tour The Labyrinth, entitled The Labyrinth Tour Live from The O2. Lewis's third album, Glassheart, was released in October 2012. "Collide" was planned as the lead single for the album, but did not make the final track listing; "Trouble" was released as the lead single instead, and "Lovebird" was released subsequently.

On 4 July 2013 Leona confirmed her fourth album would be a Christmas one, citing Motown as the album's musical direction and confirmed there would be a bit of "original material". Lewis announced that Christmas, with Love would be released on 2 December 2013 in the UK and the next day in the North America, preceded by the lead single, "One More Sleep". The song reached number three on the UK Singles Chart, giving Lewis the most Top 5 hits of any British female solo artist. In 2015, Lewis released the studio album "I Am", which charted on the top 40 in several countries, including in the UK and US. In 2018, Lewis sang alongside Calum Scott on the duet version of "You Are The Reason", to international success. In 2019, Lewis released "Solo Quiero (Somebody to Love)", from Songland. In 2021, Lewis released the single "Kiss Me It's Christmas" featuring Ne-Yo, taken from the digital and vinyl re-issue of Lewis' 2013 album Christmas, with Love, entitled "Christmas, with Love Always".

As of 2021, Lewis has sold in excess of 35 million records worldwide.

Albums

Studio albums

Re-issues

Video album

Demo albums

Extended plays

Singles

As lead artist

As featured artist

Promotional singles

Other charted songs

Other appearances

Music videos

References

Notes

Sources

External links

Leona Lewis at iTunes
Leona Lewis at Spotify

Discographies of British artists
Discography
Pop music discographies